Sereni is an Italian surname. Notable people with the surname include:

Clara Sereni (born 1946), Italian writer
Emilio Sereni (1907–1977), Italian politician
Enzo Sereni (1905–1944), Italian Zionist
Marina Sereni (born 1960), Italian politician
Mario Sereni (1928–2015), Italian opera singer
Matteo Sereni (born 1975), Italian footballer
Vittorio Sereni (1913–1983), Italian poet and writer

Italian-language surnames